4th Online Film Critics Society Awards
January 2, 2001

Best Film: 
 Almost Famous 
The 4th Online Film Critics Society Awards, honoring the best in film for 2000, were given on 2 January 2001.

Top 10 films
Almost Famous
Requiem for a Dream
Wo hu cang long (Crouching Tiger, Hidden Dragon)
Dancer in the Dark
Traffic
Gladiator
Quills
Wonder Boys
Chicken Run
Erin Brockovich

Winners and nominees

Best Picture
Almost Famous
Crouching Tiger, Hidden Dragon
Dancer in the Dark
Requiem for a Dream
Traffic

Best Director
Darren Aronofsky – Requiem for a Dream
Cameron Crowe – Almost Famous
Ang Lee – Crouching Tiger, Hidden Dragon
Steven Soderbergh – Traffic
Lars von Trier – Dancer in the Dark

Best Actor
Tom Hanks – Cast Away 
Christian Bale – American Psycho
Russell Crowe – Gladiator
Michael Douglas – Wonder Boys
Geoffrey Rush – Quills

Best Actress
Ellen Burstyn – Requiem for a Dream 
Joan Allen – The Contender
Björk – Dancer in the Dark
Laura Linney – You Can Count on Me
Julia Roberts – Erin Brockovich

Best Supporting Actor
Benicio del Toro – Traffic 
Philip Seymour Hoffman – Almost Famous 
Jack Black – High Fidelity
Willem Dafoe – Shadow of the Vampire
Albert Finney – Erin Brockovich
Joaquin Phoenix – Gladiator

Best Supporting Actress
Kate Hudson – Almost Famous 
Jennifer Connelly – Requiem for a Dream
Elaine May – Small Time Crooks
Frances McDormand – Almost Famous
Zhang Ziyi – Crouching Tiger, Hidden Dragon

Best Screenplay
Almost Famous – Cameron CroweQuills – Doug Wright
State and Main – David Mamet
Traffic – Stephen Gaghan
Wonder Boys – Steve Kloves
You Can Count on Me – Kenneth Lonergan

Best Foreign Language FilmCrouching Tiger, Hidden Dragon
The Color of Paradise
Girl on the Bridge
Shower
Yi Yi

Best Documentary
The Filth and the Fury
Dark Days
The Eyes of Tammy Faye
The Life and Times of Hank Greenberg
One Day in September

Best Cinematography
Crouching Tiger, Hidden Dragon – Peter PauGladiator – John Mathieson
O Brother, Where Art Thou? – Roger Deakins
Requiem for a Dream – Matthew Libatique
Traffic – Steven Soderbergh

Best EditingRequiem for a Dream – Jay RabinowitzCrouching Tiger, Hidden Dragon – Tim Squyres
Dancer in the Dark – François Gédigier and Molly Marlene Stensgård
Gladiator – Pietro Scalia
Traffic – Stephen Mirrione

Best EnsembleAlmost Famous
State and Main
Requiem for a Dream
Traffic
Wonder Boys

Best Original Score
Requiem for a Dream – Clint MansellCrouching Tiger, Hidden Dragon – Tan Dun
Dancer in the Dark – Björk
Gladiator – Hans Zimmer, Lisa Gerrard and Klaus Badelt
O Brother, Where Art Thou? – T-Bone Burnett and Carter Burwell

Best DVDFight Club
Gladiator
Magnolia
Seven: New Line Platinum Series Edition
Toy Story: Ultimate Toy Box Edition

Best DVD Special Features
Fight Club
Seven: New Line Platinum Series Edition
Terminator 2: Judgment Day: The Ultimate Edition
Toy Story: Ultimate Toy Box Edition

Best DVD Commentary
Fight Club
Gladiator
The Limey
Seven: New Line Platinum Series Edition
Three Kings

Best Cinematic Debut/Breakthrough
Björk – Dancer in the Dark
Jamie Bell – Billy Elliot
Patrick Fugit – Almost Famous
Kate Hudson – Almost Famous
Michelle Rodriguez – Girlfight

References 

2000
2000 film awards